Musaeus Grammaticus ( Mousaios) probably belongs to the beginning of the 6th century AD, as his style and metre are evidently modeled on those of Nonnus. He lived before Agathias (530–582) and has been identified with the friend of Procopius whose poem (340 hexameter lines) on the story of Hero and Leander is considered the most beautiful of the age (editions by Franz Passow, 1810; Gottfried Heinrich Schäfer, 1825; Karl Dilthey, 1874; Hans Färber, Hero und Leander: Musaios und die weiteren antiken Zeugnisse, Greek and Latin texts with German translation, Munich: Heimeran, 1961). The little love-poem Alpheus and Arethusa (Anthol. pal. ix. 362) is also ascribed to Musaeus.

Notes

References

 — English translation

Further reading
 — Online English translation
— Greek text with parallel French translation

External links



Late Antique writers